Itoplectis is a genus of insect belonging to the family Ichneumonidae.

The genus was first described by Förster in 1869.

The genus has cosmopolitan distribution.

Species:
Itoplectis conquisitor (Say, 1836) 
 Itoplectis maculator (Fabricius, 1775)
 Itoplectis melanocephala (Gravenhorst, 1829) - hosts include Galleria mellonella, Aletia impura, Chilo phragmitellus, Depressaria daucella, Depressaria pastinacella, and Leucania obsoleta.
 Itoplectis mexicanus - host is the pupa of Coptocycla texana
 Itoplectis naranyae (Ashmeade 1906)

References

Ichneumonidae
Ichneumonidae genera